M52, M/52 or M-52 may refer to:

 Myasishchev M-52, the second prototype of a Soviet supersonic bomber
 M52 highway (Russia)
 MEMS M-52/60, a submachine gun
 M/52 (rifle)
 M52 rifle grenade
 M52 Self Propelled Howitzer, a 1950s US self-propelled 105mm Artillery, used by the Turkish Land Forces
 BMW M52, a 1994 automobile piston engine
 Miles M.52, a 1942 British supersonic jet project
 Messier 52, an open star cluster in the constellation Cassiopeia
 M-52 (Michigan highway)
 M52 (Cape Town), a Metropolitan Route in Cape Town, South Africa
 M52 (Johannesburg), a Metropolitan Route in Johannesburg, South Africa
 M52, The North/South Metroline in Amsterdam
 M52, a Metrobus route in Sydney, Australia
 Samsung Galaxy M52 5G, an Android smartphone by Samsung Electronics.